The hermit thrush (Catharus guttatus) is a medium-sized North American thrush. It is not very closely related to the other North American migrant species of Catharus, but rather to the Mexican russet nightingale-thrush. The specific name guttatus is Latin for "spotted".

Description
It is more compact and stockier than other North American Catharus thrushes, with relatively longer wings. The hermit thrush has the white-dark-white underwing pattern characteristic of Catharus thrushes. Adults are mainly brown on the upperparts, with reddish tails. The underparts are white with dark spots on the breast and grey or brownish flanks. They have pink legs and a white eye ring. Birds in the east are more olive-brown on the upperparts; western birds are more grey-brown.

Behavior
Hermit thrushes breed in coniferous or mixed woods across Canada, southern Alaska, and the northeastern and western United States. They make a cup nest on the ground or relatively low in a tree.

While most hermit thrushes migrate to wintering grounds in the southern United States and south to Central America, some remain in northern coastal US states and southern Ontario. Identification of spotted thrushes is simplified by the fact that hermit thrush is the only spotted thrush normally found in North America during winter. They usually breed in forests, but will sometimes winter in parks and wooded suburban neighborhoods.

They are very rare vagrants to western Europe and northeast Asia.

They forage on the forest floor, also in trees or shrubs, mainly eating insects and berries.

Song
The hermit thrush's song has been described as "the finest sound in nature" and is ethereal and flute-like, consisting of a beginning note, then several descending musical phrases in a minor key, repeated at different pitches. It often sings from a high open location. Analysis of the notes of its song indicates that they are related by harmonic simple integer pitch ratios, like many kinds of human music and unlike the songs of other birds that have been similarly examined.

In culture

The hermit thrush is the state bird of Vermont.

Walt Whitman construes the hermit thrush as a symbol of the American voice, poetic and otherwise, in his elegy for Abraham Lincoln, "When Lilacs Last in the Dooryard Bloom'd," one of the fundamental texts in the American literary canon. "A Hermit Thrush" is the name of a poem by the American poet Amy Clampitt. A hermit thrush appears in the fifth section ("What the Thunder Said") of the T. S. Eliot poem The Waste Land.

Former Canadian indie-rock band Thrush Hermit took their name from a reversal of the bird's name. It is also shared by the American bands Hermit Thrushes and Hermit Thrush.

Gallery

References

Works cited
Winker, Kevin & Pruett, Christin L. (2006): "Seasonal migration, speciation, and morphological convergence in the avian genus Catharus (Turdidae)." Auk 123(4): 1052–1068. DOI: 10.1642/0004-8038(2006)123[1052:SMSAMC]2.0.CO;2

External links

Hermit thrush - Catharus guttarus - USGS Patuxent Bird Identification InfoCenter
Hermit thrush species account - Cornell Lab of Ornithology

hermit thrush
hermit thrush
Native birds of Alaska
Birds of Canada
Native birds of the Northwestern United States
Native birds of the Northeastern United States
Birds of the Sierra Nevada (United States)
Symbols of Vermont
hermit thrush
hermit thrush
Articles containing video clips